Cerro de la Estrella is an underground station along Line 8 of the metro of Mexico City.
The station is located along the  Calzada Ermita-Iztapalapa and serves the Colonia Hidalgo y Mina neighborhood within the Iztapalapa borough on the east side of the city.
The station is named for the Cerro de la Estrella – a mesoamerican archaeological site located nearby.
It was opened on 20 July 1994.

The station's logo is the silhouette of a hill with three crosses on it and a star in the sky. In spring during Easter the station sees heavy traffic for spectators who travel to Cerro de la Estrella to
watch Passion of the Christ procession events.

From 23 April to 18 June 2020, the station was temporarily closed due to the COVID-19 pandemic in Mexico.

Ridership

References

External links
 

Cerro de la Estrella
Mexico City Metro stations in Iztapalapa
Railway stations opened in 1994
1994 establishments in Mexico